NGT may refer to:

 Dutch Sign Language ("Nederlandse Gebarentaal")
 Nasogastric tube
 Nigeria's Got Talent, Nigerian talent show
 The Nonsymmetric gravitational theory of John Moffat
 Nova Geração de Televisão, a Brazilian television network
 Nominal Group Technique, a group decision-making process
New Generation Transport, proposal for a trolleybus scheme in Leeds, England
National Green Tribunal Act, Indian environmental measure
 Next Generation Train, a German high-speed rail research project